The 2012 Finger Lakes 355 at The Glen was a NASCAR Sprint Cup Series stock car race held on August 12, 2012 at the Watkins Glen International in Watkins Glen, New York. Contested over 90 laps, it was the twenty-second race of the 2012 NASCAR Sprint Cup Series season and the second of two road course competitions on the schedule. After the tragedy at the previous race, the track prepared in the event that thunderstorms pass through the track. The track had set up more than 30 police cars with loudspeakers, nine television screens, and the staff has text message availabilities, all intended on warning fans of any thunderstorms approaching. Marcos Ambrose, from the Richard Petty Motorsports racing team, won the race ahead of Brad Keselowski. Jimmie Johnson finished in the third position. The race was most notable for a "chaotic" finish.

Report

Background

Watkins Glen International is one of two road courses to hold NASCAR races, the other being Sonoma Raceway. Marcos Ambrose was the defending race winner after winning the race in 2011.

Results

Qualifying

Final Lap
With three laps to go and Kyle Busch leading, Bobby Labonte's number 47 suffered a drawn-out engine failure, leaving oil all around the track. Brad Keselowski passed Marcos Ambrose to challenge Busch for the final lap. Busch was losing traction from the oil, and slid up the racetrack, followed by Ambrose. Keselowski attempted to pass on the inside, blocked by Busch with car-to-car contact causing Busch to spin, leaving Keselowski in the lead with a damaged front quarter. Keselowski and Ambrose battled hard for first place, both driving through the grass to avoid more oil in turn 8. Ambrose took the flag, followed by Keselowski. Busch finished 7th.

Race results

References

NASCAR races at Watkins Glen International
Finger Lakes 355 at The Glen
Finger Lakes 355 at The Glen
Finger Lakes 355 at The Glen